Bonanza is a ghost town in Custer County, Idaho, United States.  It was originally established as a mining town.  As of 2005, the land is privately owned but open to the public. Custer has a museum for the gold-rush era where visitors can experience the lives of the citizens of Custer and can search for gold.

Bonanza is the site of one of many Boot Hill cemeteries.

References

Ghost towns in Idaho
Geography of Custer County, Idaho
Protected areas of Custer County, Idaho
American frontier
Boot Hill cemeteries